John La Porte Gibbs (May 3, 1838 – November 28, 1908) was a Minnesota legislator, two-time Speaker of the Minnesota House of Representatives and the 14th Lieutenant Governor of Minnesota.

Life and career
Gibbs was born in Bradford County, Pennsylvania, in 1838 to Eli and Caroline Gibbs (née Atwood), both of whom were descendants of early settlers of Massachusetts and Connecticut (respectively). He was raised on his parents farm and attended schools in Le Raysville, Pennsylvania and at the Susquehanna Collegiate Institute in Towanda, Pennsylvania before attending the University of Michigan Law School, graduating in 1861.

Gibbs moved west, traveling through Illinois and Iowa before settling in Albert Lea, Minnesota and working as a teacher. In 1862 he was elected attorney for Freeborn County, Minnesota. In 1863 he was elected to his first of five terms in the Minnesota House of Representatives as a Republican, serving from 1864 to 1866, 1876–1878, 1885–1887 and 1895–1897. He also twice served as speaker, in 1877 and 1885. After his time in the state legislature Gibbs also served as Lieutenant Governor under Governor David Marston Clough from January 5, 1897, to January 3, 1899.

While he had studied law, Gibbs earned his living as a farmer and owned property outside Geneva, Minnesota. He occasionally lectured on agricultural topics and was particularly well known as a dairy farmer, even winning election as president of the Minnesota Dairymen's Association in 1893.

Gibbs died on November 28, 1908, in Owatonna, Minnesota.

References

1838 births
1908 deaths
People from Albert Lea, Minnesota
Lieutenant Governors of Minnesota
Speakers of the Minnesota House of Representatives
Republican Party members of the Minnesota House of Representatives
University of Michigan Law School alumni
People from Bradford County, Pennsylvania
People from Geneva, Minnesota
19th-century American politicians